Joe Greenwood (born 2 April 1993) is an English professional rugby league footballer who plays as a  forward for the Huddersfield Giants in the Betfred Super League, the England Knights and England at international level.

He played for St Helens and the Wigan Warriors in the Super League, and on loan from Wigan at the Leeds Rhinos in the top flight. Greenwood has also played for the Gold Coast Titans in the NRL.

Background
Greenwood was born in Oldham, Greater Manchester, England.

He played his junior rugby league for the Saddleworth Rangers club.

Career

St Helens
In 2014 won the Super League Championship with St Helens.

Gold Coast Titans
On 20 February 2017, he signed to play for the Gold Coast in the National Rugby League.

Wigan Warriors
He played in the 2018 Super League Grand Final victory over Warrington at Old Trafford.

Leeds Rhinos (loan)
On 25 February 2020, Wigan allowed Greenwood to sign a short eight-week contract with Leeds.

Wigan Warriors (return)
He played in the 2020 Super League Grand Final which Wigan lost 8-4 against St Helens.

Huddersfield Giants
On 10 December 2020, it was announced that Greenwood would be joining Huddersfield on a two-year deal from the 2021 season.
In round 2 of the 2021 Super League season, he was sent off after a dangerous high tackle in Huddersfield's 20-10 loss against the Catalans Dragons.
On 28 May 2022, Greenwood played for Huddersfield in their 2022 Challenge Cup Final loss to Wigan.

International career
In July 2018 he was selected in the England Knights Performance squad.

Greenwood made his full international début v New Zealand at Elland Road, Leeds on 11 November 2018, coming off the bench in the 0-34 defeat.
In 2019 he was selected for the England Knights against Jamaica at Headingley Rugby Stadium.

Personal
Joe Greenwood's older brother, James Greenwood, also plays as a professional.

References

External links

Wigan Warriors profile
SL profile
Gold Coast Titans profile
St Helens profile
Saints Heritage Society profile

1993 births
Living people
England Knights national rugby league team players
England national rugby league team players
English rugby league players
Gold Coast Titans players
Huddersfield Giants players
Rugby league players from Oldham
Rugby league second-rows
St Helens R.F.C. players
Wigan Warriors players